Bagla is a small village in Adampur Mandal, Hisar District, Haryana State, India. Bagla is 13 km from its mandal main town Adampur along the Hisar-Adampur road. Bagla is 26 km from its district main city Hisar, and 265 km from its state main city Chandigarh.

History
When the first families settled in the village, they brought bullock carts called buggi. The village was called  "buggi wala" because these buggi were a new thing for this area. Over time, "buggi wala" was shortened to Bagla.

Transportation
The road connecting with district headquarters is known as Bagla Road, and in modern times this road has become a national highway.

People
Members of several castes live together in the village. The main occupation of the villagers in the past has been agriculture but in modern times many young people are finding occupations according to their interests.

Infrastructure
Bagla has a government high school and two primary schools. There is a private senior secondary school, Moga Devi Minda Memorial School.

Bagla also has a temple of Jwala Mata, a multipurpose hall. and a multispeciality hospital named SL Minda Memorial Hospital.

Government
Bagla is in the Adampur Assembly segment constituency. The local governing body in Bagla is Panchayat. The current head of Panchayat, called as Sarpanch, is  Rajendra Saharan since February 2016.

References

Villages in Hisar district